Saverio Ritter (24 January 1884 – 21 April 1951) was an Italian prelate of the Catholic Church who worked in the diplomatic service of the Holy See.

He was born in Chiavenna, in the Province of Sondrio, Italy, on 24 January 1884 and was ordained priest on 9 September 1906.

He was posted to Prague as secretary of the nunciature in 1927 along with Pietro Ciriaci to resolve the ongoing crisis in diplomatic relations between Czechoslovakia and the Holy See occasioned by local celebrations of Jan Hus, viewed as a heretic by the Church and a national hero to many Czechs. The Nuncio to Czechoslovakia, Francesco Marmaggi, had withdrawn to Rome in protest.

On 5 August 1935 he was named a titular archbishop and appointed Apostolic Nuncio to Czechoslovakia. He was consecrated a bishop by cardinal Eugenio Pacelli on 11 August 1935.

His service was interrupted by World War II, when the German Nazi regime established a client state, the Slovak Republic, which was recognized by several countries, including the Holy See, which maintained a diplomatic office headed by a chargé d’affaires, Giuseppe Burzio.

On 11 May 1946 Ritter was named Internuncio to Czechoslovakia, but illness allowed him to perform his duties only intermittently. Nevertheless, because of his support for the Czechoslovakian bishops against the new regime, the government declared him undesirable in March 1949 and he left Prague in July.

He was posted to the Secretariat of State in Rome in 1948.

He died in Rome on 21 April 1951.

References

External links
Saverio Ritter on www.catholic-hierarchy.org 

20th-century Italian Roman Catholic bishops
1951 deaths
1884 births
Apostolic Nuncios to Czechoslovakia
People from Chiavenna